The Kentucky Turf Cup is a Grade II American Thoroughbred horse race for three years olds and older, over a distance of  miles on the turf held annually in September at Kentucky Downs racetrack in Franklin, Kentucky during their short turf meeting.

History

The event was inaugurated on 22 April 1990 as the Sam Houston Stakes on the first ever meeting at the new track then known as the Duelling Grounds Racecourse. The race was in honor of Sam Houston who took part in a duel on the site of where the racetrack is located near the border of Kentucky and Tennessee. The following year the event was renamed to the Sam Houston Handicap, and conditions were changed to a handicap.

In 1996 and 1997 the event was not held due to the track being shut down and in bankruptcy proceedings.

When the track reopened in 1998 the race was renamed the Kentucky Cup Turf Handicap as part of the Kentucky Cup Turf Festival.
In 2001 the event was classified as Grade III.

In 2019, the purse was increased to $1,000,000.

In 2021 the event was upgraded by the Thoroughbred Owners and Breeders Association to a Grade II. For the 2021 running Kentucky Downs renamed the event to The Calumet Turf Cup which is sponsored by Calumet Farm. The winner of the event, Imperador set a new track record for the distance of 2:25.70.

Records
Speed  record
 miles: 2:25.70 – Imperador (2021) (new course record)

Margins
 lengths  – Silverfoot (2005)

Most wins
 2 – Rochester (2002, 2003)
 2 – Da Big Hoss (2015, 2016)
 2 – Arklow (2018, 2020)

Most wins by an owner
 2 – Augustin Stable (2002, 2003)
 2 – Robert E. Courtney Jr. (2011, 2012)
 2 – Skychia Racing (2015, 2016)
 2 – Donegal Racing, Joseph Bulger & Peter Coneway (2018, 2020)

Most wins by a jockey
 4 – Florent Geroux (2014, 2016, 2018, 2020)

Most wins by a trainer
 5 – Michael J. Maker (2015, 2016, 2017, 2019, 2022)

Winners

Notes:

† In the 2003  running, Art Variety was first past the post but was disqualified for interference in the straight and placed third. Rochester was declared the winner.

See also
List of American and Canadian Graded races

References

Kentucky Downs
Graded stakes races in the United States
Grade 2 stakes races in the United States
Horse races in Kentucky
Turf races in the United States
Open middle distance horse races
Recurring events established in 1990
Horse racing in Kentucky